Racemorphan, or morphanol, is the racemic mixture of the two stereoisomers of 17-methylmorphinan-3-ol, each with differing pharmacology and effects:

 Dextrorphan - an antitussive and  dissociative hallucinogen (NMDA receptor antagonist)
 Levorphanol - an opioid analgesic

Racemorphan itself is under international control per the Single Convention on Narcotic Drugs 1961 and is therefore listed as a Schedule II Narcotic controlled substance in the US Controlled Substances Act 1970; it has an ACSCN of 9733 and in 2014 it had an aggregate annual manufacturing quota of zero.   The salts in use are hydrobromide (free base conversion ratio  0.741), hydrochloride (0.876), and tartrate (0.632).

See also
 Levallorphan
 Methorphan
 Morphinan
 Cyclorphan

See also 
 Cough syrup
 Noscapine
 Codeine; Pholcodine
 Dextromethorphan; Dimemorfan
 Dextrorphan; Levorphanol
 Butamirate
 Pentoxyverine
 Tipepidine
 Cloperastine
 Levocloperastine

References

Morphinans
Opioids
Phenols
Glycine receptor antagonists
NMDA receptor antagonists
Nicotinic antagonists
Mu-opioid receptor agonists
Serotonin–norepinephrine reuptake inhibitors
Sigma agonists
Calcium channel blockers